= Valteri =

Neighbourhood in Jurmala, Latvia

Coordinates: 56.945°N 23.697°E

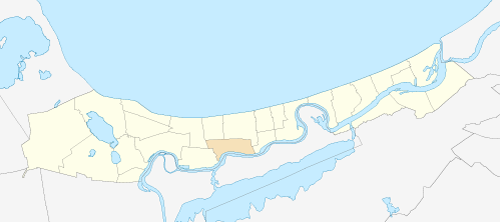
- Location in Jūrmala
- Country: Latvia
- City: Jūrmala

Area
  - Total: 3.1 km^{2} (1.2 sq mi)
- Elevation: 3 m (9.8 ft)

Population (2008)
  - Total: 873
  - Density: 281.6/km^{2} (729/sq mi)

Valteri is a residential area and neighbourhood of the city Jūrmala, Latvia.

== History ==
The name derives from the name Waltershof, which was first mentioned in the property records due to the fact that Doroteja Valtere, the owner of the estate, sold it to merchant Karls Kristaps Rikmanis in 1788.
